democracia Abierta is a global platform that publishes Spanish, Portuguese and English voices that influence debates on democracy, mobilisation, justice, citizen participation and human rights in the Latin American continent, Europe and the rest of the world.

openDemocracy 

openDemocracy is an independent global media platform publishing up to 60 articles a week and attracting over 8 million visits per year.

openDemocracy is a non-profit federation comprising the Main site and a number of editorially and financially independent Sections.

democraciaAbierta, like the other independent sections of openDemocracy, shares the mission of challenging power and inspiring progressive change in specific priority areas.

Alongside democraciaAbierta there are the four other main sections:

oDR – on liberty in Russia and Eurasia

Publishing in English and Russian, and covering politics, civil society, human rights  and culture in Russia and the former Soviet states.

50.50 – strategies for inclusive democracy

Critical perspectives on social justice, gender equality and pluralism. International in breadth whilst sensitive to local particularities and heritages, 50.50 gives voice to  women's human rights defenders working on the front line of resistance to  patriarchy, fundamentalisms and other forms of social injustices.

Transformation – where love meets social justice

Telling the stories of those who are combining personal and social change in order to reimagine their societies.

democraciaAbierta – the ‘Latin’ section of openDemocracy

Publishing in English, Spanish and Portuguese, democraciaAbierta is a global  platform for Latin American voices, debating democracy, mobilization, participation,  human and civil rights across the continent, Europe and beyond.

openDemocracyUK – on the crisis of democracy in Britain

Questioning and investigating power in the United Kingdom, whether public or secret, cultural or economic, from the perspective of securing and enhancing our shared liberty. openDemocracyUK hosts OurNHS and OurBeeb, unique forums examining two of Britain's most significant institutions, and Shine a Light: a project to expose injustice led by award-winning investigative journalist Clare Sambrook.

Creative Commons 

By publishing with Creative Commons licensing, democraciaAbierta extends the reach of its articles far beyond its own website and readership, as they are cross-posted, referenced and  translated into other languages.

Funding & Legal 

democraciaAbierta depends on support from individuals and organisations who appreciate the importance of its work.

As part of openDemocracy.net, democraciaAbierta is published by openDemocracy Limited, a UK registered company (#3855274) limited by guarantee and wholly owned by the non-profit openDemocracy Foundation for the Advancement of Global Education (company limited by guarantee #04807614).

References

External links 
 https://www.opendemocracy.net/democraciaabierta

British news websites